Idaho is a 1943 American Western film directed by Joseph Kane.

Plot
Judge John Grey decides to close down Belle Bonner's casino as a bad influence to the children in the community. It turns out, though, that Grey is actually a former outlaw named Tom Allison, and this information is used by Belle and her crony Duke Springer to blackmail the judge. It's up to Roy Rogers to ride into town and save the day.

Cast 
Roy Rogers as State Ranger Roy Rogers
Smiley Burnette as Frog Millhouse
Bob Nolan as Singer
Sons of the Pioneers as Musicians
Virginia Grey as Terry Grey
Harry Shannon as Judge John Grey aka Tom Allison
Ona Munson as Belle Bonner
Dick Purcell as Duke Springer
Onslow Stevens as State Ranger Bob Stevens
Arthur Hohl as Spike Madagan
Hal Taliaferro as Bud (Belle's henchman)
The Robert Mitchell Boys Choir as Wayward Boys at the Ranch

External links 
 
 
 

1943 films
1943 Western (genre) films
Republic Pictures films
American black-and-white films
American Western (genre) films
Films directed by Joseph Kane
1940s English-language films
1940s American films